Naveed is a single from Our Lady Peace's debut album of the same name, Naveed. It was released in 1995 in the United States and in January 1996 in the United Kingdom as the fifth and final single from the album. The song performed well on the charts, and became a hit in Canada. The music video also climbed the charts on MuchMusic, and in 1998 was ranked the thirty-third favourite video of all time.

Since the album's release, Naveed has been a staple in the band's live performances. The song was also performed on Late Night with Conan O'Brien. It is also many times combined with another song, most notably "Life" from the album Spiritual Machines. This form of the song appeared on the band's 2003 album, Live.

Music video
The music video for Naveed, directed by George Vale, alternates between the band performing in front of a crowd, and children playing in an overly brightened salvage yard meant to represent a war-torn country while dodging a prowling M4 Sherman tank and a menacing ventriloquist dummy, which was a recurring theme of their early videos. Imagery evoking Lord of the Flies is also used with brief shots of a pig head on a pike and one of the children getting injured and presumably being left for dead by the others.

Chart performance

References

External links

1995 singles
1996 singles
Our Lady Peace songs
Songs written by Raine Maida
1995 songs